Turnu Roșu Pass (all of these names meaning Red Tower Pass in the respective languages) is a mountain pass in the Romanian Carpathians, connecting Vâlcea County (Wallachia) and Sibiu County (Transylvania). It is formed by the Olt River flowing southwards from Transylvania to Wallachia through the Southern Carpathians.

Mountain passes of Romania
Mountain passes of the Carpathians